Gérard Auguste Bourbotte (7 February 1934 – 25 June 2016) was a French professional footballer who played as a forward. He is the third top scorer in the history of Lille.

References 

1934 births
2016 deaths
Sportspeople from Nord (French department)
French footballers
Association football forwards
Lille OSC players
RC Strasbourg Alsace players
Red Star F.C. players
Stade Français (association football) players
Ligue 1 players
Ligue 2 players
Footballers from Hauts-de-France